The John of London was a ship famous for bringing the first printing press to the British Colonies of  North America; however, the first press in the American continent had arrived in 1536 in Mexico City by Juan Pablos in representation of Juan Cromberger.

Construction and Service 
The John of London was possibly built during the 1620s by Robert Trenckmore in his shipyards at Shoreham-By-Sea in West Sussex, England. At least once during her 20-30 year lifespan, she was refitted as a fighting ship.

Brings the first printing press to North America 
The ship was captained by George Lamberton during her 1638 voyage from Hull, Yorkshire to Boston, Massachusetts. This voyage brought Ezekiel Rogers and a number of families that went on to settle Rowley, Massachusetts. The voyage was also notable for bringing the first printing press to North America, which went on to be used at Harvard College.

Fate 
The John of London was captured and sunk near Bass Rock in the Firth of Forth, Scotland, during 1650.

References
Paine, Lincoln P., Ships of the World, An Historical Encyclopedia; Houghton Mifflin Company, Boston, 1997. (p. 619)
Spectre, Peter H. and Larkin, David, Wooden Ship, Houghton Mifflin Company, Boston; 1991.
Paine, Lincoln P., Ships of the World, An Historical Encyclopedia; Houghton Mifflin Company, Boston, 1997. (Centerpiece)
Cheal, Henry, The Story of Shoreham, Hove Combridges, 1921. (pp. 148–149)
Atwater, Edward, History of the Colony of New Haven; 1880. (pp. 84, 85)
Lauder-Frost, G.M.S., East Lothian Life, Issue 22, Autumn 1996,
Corydon Ireland, Harvard Gazette, The instrument behind New England’s first literary flowering; Harvard University, Cambridge, 2012.

Notes

External links
John of London Passenger List, Summer of 1638
The instrument behind New England’s first literary flowering
Rowley and Ezekiel Rogers, The First North American Printing Press

17th-century ships